The 1971 UMass Redmen football team represented the University of Massachusetts Amherst in the 1971 NCAA College Division football season as a member of the Yankee Conference. The team was coached by Dick MacPherson and played its home games at Warren McGuirk Alumni Stadium in Hadley, Massachusetts. The 1971 season was the last in which Massachusetts was named the "Redmen," as the university would change the nickname of all athletic teams to the "Minutemen" due to changing attitudes regarding the use of Native American-themed mascots in sports. It was also the first season of Dick MacPherson's tenure as head coach. UMass finished the season with a record of 4–4–1 overall and 3–1–1 in conference play.

Schedule

Roster

References

UMass
UMass Minutemen football seasons
Yankee Conference football champion seasons
UMass Redmen football